Sultan Muhammad Zahir ud-din, better known as well Mirza Mughal (1817 – 23 September 1857), was a Mughal prince. He played a significant role during the Indian Rebellion of 1857. He was one of the Mughal princes shot dead at one of the gates of Old Delhi, which gate thereafter came to be known as "Khooni Darwaza" ( 'bloody gate' or 'murder gate').

Early life
Mirza Mughal was the fifth son of Bahadur Shah Zafar, the 20th and last Mughal emperor. His mother, Sharif-ul-Mahal Sayyidini, came from an aristocratic Sayyid family that claimed descent from Muhammad.

Following the death in 1856 of his elder step-brother Mirza Fakhru, Mirza Mughal became the eldest surviving legitimately born son of Bahadur Shah Zafar. However, the British refused to recognize anybody as heir to the throne of Delhi, and indicated that the monarchy would be abolished following Zafar's death.

War of 1857

In May 1857, sepoys in the service of the East India Company rebelled against their British officers and streamed into Delhi. They made straight for the palace, apprised the Emperor of their grievances against their British superiors, affirmed their allegiance to him, and sought sanctuary and leadership. A few days later, after taking stock of the situation, Mirza Mughal and some of his half-brothers petitioned their father to be appointed in charge of the rebel troops. Their plea was initially refused but later granted, and Mirza Mughal, as the senior-most legitimate prince, was designated commander-in-chief. Though the emperor seems to have opposed the cold-blooded killing of the European prisoners, the princes also seem to have been involved in the act. Mirza Mughal had absolutely no training or experience for his new office. However, he energetically sought to organize the troops, make arrangements for their billeting and provisioning, and bring a semblance of order to the edgy city. His inexperience soon became apparent, and he was upstaged a few weeks later by the arrival of a large force of mutineers from Bareilly, led by Bakht Khan, formerly an Indian officer (Subedar) in the service of the East India Company. Bakht Khan had earned a reputation as an artillery officer during the Afghan wars. Shortly after his arrival, the emperor appointed Bakht Khan commander-in-chief and left Mirza Mughal in charge of supplies. A few weeks later, following another reshuffle of offices, Mirza Mughal was given charge of administering the city of Delhi.

Capture

By the middle of September 1857, the disorganized rebellion had run its course as far as the city of Delhi was concerned. British forces had reclaimed control of the areas surrounding Delhi and were massed on the ridge overlooking the city for a final assault on the city, which was being rapidly abandoned by its citizens, who fled mainly to their villages in the countryside. As the British took control of the city, Emperor Bahadur Shah II (aged 82) left the Red Fort and took refuge in Humayun’s Tomb, which at that time lay outside Delhi. With him were Mirza Mughal and two other princes (another son, Mirza Khizr Sultan, and a grandson, Mirza Abu Bakr). Their whereabouts was reported by spies to Major Hodson, who sent them a message saying that the party had no hope of escape and should surrender. They refused to surrender.

The next morning, Hodson went to the tomb with one hundred Indian sowars (cavalrymen) and demanded the unconditional surrender of the Emperor and princes. The situation became known to people of nearby villages, and a substantial crowd gathered, many of whom were equipped with whatever arms (farm-knives, sickles and axes) they normally kept. Resistance at this point was never the plan of the Emperor, who had come to the tomb of his illustrious forebear to pray and grieve, and perhaps in the hope that the sanctity of the tomb would provide a sanctuary for himself and his surviving family. Hodson sent two Indian aides (Rajab Ali and Ilahe Bakhsh) into the garden tomb to negotiate with the Emperor. Bahadur Shah sent a response to Hodson offering the surrender of his immediate party on condition that his life would be spared. Hodson explicitly agreed to this.

Agreement being reached, the Emperor, trusting to the word of Hodson as a British officer, emerged from the tomb and exchanged greetings in person with Hodson. Finding the old man extremely frail with exertion, Hodson told the Emperor to rest under a shady tree and accept refreshments. The Emperor was then sent back to Delhi, carried in a palanquin with an escort of Sikh sowars from Hodson's Horse. Meanwhile, the remaining ninety troopers collected the arms of the motley crowd of villagers, jihadis and courtiers, who surrendered their weaponry without dissent at the bidding of their Emperor.

Death
Shortly afterwards, with the Emperor secured but clearly in no condition to be transported to the city, Hodson set out for the city with a small party of troopers. Riding on horses, they soon caught up with the party carrying the princes. As they approached the gates of the city, Hodson found that a crowd of townsmen had gathered in the expectation of witnessing the return of the Emperor and the princes. Also, a crowd of curious villagers and armed civilians had followed in the wake of the Princes as they travelled the few miles to the gates of Delhi.

At the city gate, Hodson ordered the three princes to get off the cart. They were then stripped of their upper garments. The bare-chested princes were lined up in clear sight of the crowd. Hodson then took out his gun and himself shot the three unarmed and half-naked princes at point-blank range. After killing the princes, Hodson personally stripped their bodies of jewellery, being the signet rings, turquoise arm-bands and bejewelled swords worn by the three princes. He pocketed these valuables as trophies of war, although they had been obtained by killing disarmed prisoners of war under dubious circumstances. The bodies of the three princes were thrown back into the bullock-cart, taken to a kotwali (police-station) within the city, thrown on the ground in front of that building and left exposed there to be seen by all.

The gate near which the executions were performed became known as Khooni Darwaza meaning "Bloody Gate" or "Murder Gate."

References

Bibliography
William Dalrymple, The Last Mughal: The Fall of a Dynasty: Delhi, 1857 published by Penguin, 2006, 

1817 births
1857 deaths
Mughal princes
People from Delhi
Revolutionaries of the Indian Rebellion of 1857
Executed Indian people
People executed by the British military by firearm
People executed by India by firearm
Timurid dynasty
19th-century executions by British India